The 2022 U.S. Poker Open was the fourth edition of the U.S. Poker Open, a series of high-stakes poker tournaments held at ARIA Resort & Casino in Las Vegas, Nevada. The series ran from March 16-28, with 12 scheduled events culminating in the $50,000 No-Limit Hold'em tournament finale.

Sean Winter, runner-up in the previous two U.S. Poker Opens, won the last two events to earn the $50,000 championship and Golden Eagle trophy. 

Final tables were streamed on PokerGO.

Schedule

Series leaderboard

Series Stats

Results

Event #1: $10,000 No-Limit Hold'em 

 2-Day Event: March 16-17
 Number of Entries: 93
 Total Prize Pool: $930,000
 Number of Payouts: 14
 Winning Hand:

Event #2: $10,000 Pot-Limit Omaha 

 2-Day Event: March 17-18
 Number of Entries: 77
 Total Prize Pool: $770,000
 Number of Payouts: 11
 Winning Hand:

Event #3: $10,000 No-Limit Hold'em 

 2-Day Event: March 18-19
 Number of Entries: 88 
 Total Prize Pool: $880,000
 Number of Payouts: 13
 Winning Hand:

Event #4: $10,000 Big Bet Mix 

 2-Day Event: March 19-20
 Number of Entries: 53
 Total Prize Pool: $530,000
 Number of Payouts: 8
 Winning Hand:  (No-Limit Hold'em)

Event #5: $10,000 No-Limit Hold'em 

 2-Day Event: March 20-21
 Number of Entries: 66
 Total Prize Pool: $660,000
 Number of Payouts: 10
 Winning Hand:

Event #6: $15,000 8-Game 

 2-Day Event: March 21-22
 Number of Entries: 47
 Total Prize Pool: $705,000
 Number of Payouts: 7
 Winning Hand:  (Limit Hold'em)

Event #7: $15,000 No-Limit Hold'em 

 2-Day Event: March 22-23
 Number of Entries: 70
 Total Prize Pool: $1,050,000
 Number of Payouts: 10
 Winning Hand:

Event #8: $15,000 Pot-Limit Omaha 

 2-Day Event: March 23-24
 Number of Entries: 67
 Total Prize Pool: $1,005,000
 Number of Payouts: 10
 Winning Hand:

Event #9: $25,000 No-Limit Hold'em 

 2-Day Event: March 24-25
 Number of Entries: 63
 Total Prize Pool: $1,575,000
 Number of Payouts: 9
 Winning Hand:

Event #10: $25,000 Pot-Limit Omaha 

 2-Day Event: March 25-26
 Number of Entries: 49
 Total Prize Pool: $1,225,000
 Number of Payouts: 7
 Winning Hand:

Event #11: $25,000 No-Limit Hold'em 

 2-Day Event: March 26-27
 Number of Entries: 55
 Total Prize Pool: $1,375,000
 Number of Payouts: 8
 Winning Hand:

Event #12: $50,000 No-Limit Hold'em 

 2-Day Event: March 27-28
 Number of Entries: 42
 Total Prize Pool: $2,100,000
 Number of Payouts: 6
 Winning Hand:

References

External links 

 Official website

Television shows about poker
Poker tournaments
2022 in poker
2022 in sports in Nevada